A mobile lounge is a system for boarding and disembarking from aircraft using a bus-like vehicle.

Purpose
The mobile lounge was an innovative feature of the Washington Dulles terminal design by Eero Saarinen. Saarinen promoted the mobile lounge concept with a short animated film by Charles and Ray Eames. Dulles Airport was the realization of the concepts expressed in the film. Dulles's designers thought that by shuttling from the main terminal directly to a midfield jet ramp, they could save passengers from long walking distances amidst weather, noise, and fumes on the ramp. The advent of the jet bridge and construction of the two midfield concourse buildings at this airport negated the benefits of the system.

Application
The mobile lounge is used at Washington Dulles International Airport in the U.S. state of Virginia and at Montréal-Trudeau International Airport in the Canadian province of Quebec. The system was also previously used at Montreal Mirabel International Airport, John F. Kennedy International Airport's International Terminal in New York City, Mexico City Airport until 2007, Charles de Gaulle Airport in Paris and at King Abdulaziz International Airport in Jeddah, Saudi Arabia until the early 2000s. 

While it is still used at Dulles Airport, the growth in passenger numbers and aircraft capacity made it impractical to use mobile lounges for individual flights.  Remote concourses were constructed, and the fleet of mobile lounges was used as a shuttle between the concourses and the main terminal.  On January 26, 2010, the Metropolitan Washington Airports Authority replaced the Dulles mobile lounge system for passenger movements between the Main Terminal and the A-, B-, and C-Gates with the underground AeroTrain.  However, some mobile lounges and plane mates remain in use for passenger movements between the main terminal and Concourse D (until the replacement Concourses C and D are built and the AeroTrain is built out to run in a continuous two-way loop), to disembark international passengers from all arriving international aircraft (with the exception of United Airlines and certain Star Alliance flights, which are directly serviced at Concourse C's Federal Inspection Station; and flights from airports with border preclearance) and carry them to the International Arrivals Building, and to convey passengers between the main terminal and aircraft on hard stands (i.e., those parked remotely on the tarmac without access to jet bridges).

PTVs are still in use at the Philadelphia International Airport at Terminals A-East and A-West. The PTVs are utilized to support international flights in A-East and A-West during peak times, when no regular gates are available.

Variants

Passenger Transfer Vehicle (PTV)
The Passenger Transfer Vehicle or Passenger Transport Vehicle (PTV) (mobile lounge) is a 54-by-16-foot carriage mounted on a scissor truck, capable of carrying 102 passengers. These vehicles were designed by the Chrysler Corporation in association with the Budd Company, and are sometimes nicknamed "moon buggies" due to their otherworldly appearance.  When mobile lounges were first introduced, they had ramps at one end that could be raised or lowered to the floor height of an aircraft. However, after Dulles built the midfield concourses, some of the lounges were retrofitted to be used only for inter-terminal passenger transport. The ramps were removed and doors that could interlock with a terminal building were fitted to either end.  Mobile lounges have a driver's cab at each end.  The wheels at either end of the lounge can be steered, but the wheels at the end opposite the driver lock into a straight-ahead configuration so that the lounge is steered only by the forward driving wheels.

Plane Mate
The Plane Mate is an evolutionary variation on the mobile lounge concept. They are similar in appearance to mobile lounges, but can raise themselves on screws (parts of which are contained in a pair of fin-like towers above the vehicles) to "mate" directly with an aircraft. These are used at Dulles and Dorval. This allows passengers to deplane directly aboard and be carried to the main terminal. They are easily identified by the different window configuration. More noticeably, plane mates have two short columns on the roof with yellow beacons mounted on the top, and have an accordion-like canopy at one end (similar to the canopy seen at the end of a jet bridge) and have only one driver's cab and one set of steering wheels at the canopy end.

NASA Crew Transport Vehicles
Early in the space shuttle program, NASA used the Plane Mate system of mobile lounge to move astronauts directly from the orbiter to crew facilities. A modified vehicle obtained from Baltimore/Washington International Thurgood Marshall Airport in Baltimore, Maryland was used for shuttle landings at Edwards Air Force Base. A similar vehicle was used at the Kennedy Space Center to take astronauts directly from the orbiter to the Operations and Checkout building, where the vehicle was again lifted up for the astronauts to exit directly onto the 2nd floor of the facility.

Gallery

See also

Astronaut transfer van
Mobile Quarantine Facility

References

Buses by type
Airport infrastructure
Public transport by mode